Sultan Idris Iskandar Al-Mutawakkil Alallahi Shah Ibni Almarhum Sultan Iskandar Shah Kaddasullah, CMG (17 August 1924 – 31 January 1984) was the 33rd Sultan of Perak from 5 January 1963 until his death on 31 January 1984. He was the son of Sultan Iskandar Shah.

Early life and education
He was born on 17 August 1924 at Istana Negara, Kuala Kangsar, Perak as the second son of Sultan Iskandar and Raja Puteh Umi Kalsom. His father was a son of Sultan Iskandar Shah and a brother of Sultan Abdul Jalil. His oldest brother died when he was only 40 days old. He was named Raja Idris Shah at birth.

He was educated at Clifford School, Kuala Kangsar and furthered his studies at the Malay College Kuala Kangsar. He was made Raja Di Hilir in 1933, succeeding Raja Chulan, who died that year. He was appointed Raja Bendahara in October 1938 upon the demise of his father. Ten years later, on 29 March 1948, the then sultan, Sultan Abdul Aziz, died and Raja Idris was made Raja Muda (Crown Prince) by his cousin, the new sultan, Sultan Yussuf Izzuddin Shah.

Sultan of Perak
Upon the death of his cousin Sultan Yussuff Izzuddin Shah on 5 January 1963, he was appointed as the 33rd Sultan of Perak assuming title – Sultan Idris Iskandar Al-Mutawakkil Alallahi Shah Ibni Almarhum Sultan Iskandar Shah Kaddasullah.

Marriages and children
Sultan Idris married firstly, Raja Noor Izah binti Raja Ali. She was styled Raja Puan Besar until their divorce 14 years later. He then married his cousin Raja Muzwin, the daughter of Raja Arif Shah Raja Harun, on 12 August 1943. Idris and Raja Muzwin are first cousins once removed. Idris's grandfather, Sultan Idris Shah I, is Raja Muzwin's great-grandfather. She became known as Raja Perempuan upon Sultan Idris ascending the Perak throne. Among his children were:
 Raja Nazhatul Shima (born 1952), who is Raja Puan Besar (Crown Princess) of Perak married to His Royal Highness Raja Muda (Crown Prince) of Perak, Raja Jaafar ibni Almarhum Raja Muda Musa on 12 January 2019 after her first husband, Syed Omar Alsagoff died in 2017.
 Raja Dato' Seri Izzuddin Iskandar Shah (born 1953), married Tengku Datin Seri Noor Hazah (born 1955).
 Raja Iskandar Zulkarnain (born 1955), who is Raja Di Hilir, married Tunku Soraya, daughter of Sultan Abdul Halim of Kedah.
 Raja Halimahton Shahrin (1957-2019), drowned at sea while scuba diving in Pulau Perhentian, Besut, Terengganu.
 Raja Zarith Sofiah (born 1959), who is Permaisuri (Queen Consort) of Johor married His Majesty Sultan Ibrahim Ismail of Johor.
 Raja Jamil Ariffin (born 1962), married to Datin Seri Fazilah Hani binti Harun on 18 February 2021 after his first wife, Tengku Datin Seri Dato' Zalila binti Tengku Kamarulzaman died in 2020. 
 Raja Radziatul Zahar (born 1965), died during infancy.

The Sultan was also claimed to have a son with an Elizabeth Rosa, who was given up for adoption. Keith Williams was raised in Wales, and in 2015 traced his birth parents for a documentary for S4C.

His grandchildren:
By Raja Nazhatul Shima (Raja Puan Besar of Perak) and Syed Omar Alsagoff:
Syed Saif Alsagoff (born 1973)
Syed Ibrahim Alsagoff (born 1976)
Syed Redzuan Alsagoff (born 1981)
Syed Shareef Alsagoff (born 1983)
Syed Idris Alsagoff (born 1986)
Syed Iskandar Alsagoff (born 1988)
By Yang Teramat Mulia Raja Dato' Seri Izzuddin Iskandar (born 1953) and Tengku Datin Seri Noor Hazah (born ) daughter of (Tengku Abdul Aziz Shah):
Raja Teh Umi Kalsom (born 28 October 1978)
Raja Muzaffar Idris Shah (born 28 December 1979)
Raja Putra Muhamad Riza (born 13 December 1981)
By Duli Yang Amat Mulia Raja Iskandar Zulkarnain (Raja Di-Hilir of Perak) and Tunku Soraya (Raja Puan Muda Perak) daughter of Sultan Abdul Halim of Kedah):
Raja Nabil Imran (born 1987)
Raja Idris Shah (born 1989)
Raja Sarina Intan Bahiyah (born 1992)
Raja Safia Azizah (born 1997)
Raja Siffudin Muadzam' Shah (born 2000)
By Duli Yang Maha Mulia Raja Zarith Sofiah (Queen Consort of Johor) and Sultan Ibrahim Ismail of Johor:
Tunku Mahkota of Johor (Crown Prince of Johor), Tunku Ismail Idris (born 1984)
Tunku Tun Aminah Maimunah Iskandariah (born 1986)
Tunku Temenggong of Johor, Tunku Idris (born 1987)
Tunku Laksamana of Johor, Tunku Abdul Jalil (1990-2015)
Tunku Panglima of Johor, Tunku Abdul Rahman Hassanal-Jefri (born 1993)
Tunku Putera of Johor, Tunku Abu Bakar (born 2001)
By Raja Jamil Ariffin and Tengku Zalila (princess of the House of Jamalullail (Perlis)):
 Raja Rafiuddin Ariff Shah (born 1992)
 Raja Idris Iskandar Shah (born 1995)
 Raja Muhammad Hazim Shah (born 2003)
His great-grandchildren :
By Tunku Ismail Idris and Che' Puan Besar Khaleeda:
Tunku Khalsom Aminah Sofiah (born on ) (age ) 
Tunku Iskandar Abdul Jalil Abu Bakar Ibrahim (born on ) (age )
Tunku Abu Bakar Ibrahim (born ) (age )
Tunku Zahrah Zarith Aziyah (born ) (age )
Syed Ibrahim Alsagoff and Suzanna:
Sharifah Nadyatul Iman Alsagoff (born on ) (age )
Syed Ismail Iman Alsagoff (born on ) (age )

Death and succession

Sultan Idris Shah II was the frontrunner to be elected Malaysia's eighth Yang Di-Pertuan Agong. However it was fated that on 31 January 1984, a week before being elected by his all Malay rulers, he suddenly died after suffering a heart attack at the Angkatan Tentera Hospital, Lumut at 11:15 pm.

He was 59 and was the Sultan of Perak for 21 years.

He was interred at the Al-Ghufran Royal Mausoleum at Bukit Chandan and the posthumous title of Marhum Afifullah was conferred. He funeral took place on 3 February 1984 and he was buried at the Al-Ghufran Royal Mausoleum near Ubudiah Mosque, Kuala Kangsar.

He was succeeded by his first cousin once removed, Raja Azlan Shah.

Legacy
The state mosque of Perak in Ipoh and Sultan Idris Shah II Bridge in Bota are named after him.

Honours

Honours of Perak 
 Grand Master of the Royal Family Order of Perak (5 January 1963 – 31 January 1984)
 Grand Master of the Order of Cura Si Manja Kini (5 January 1963 – 31 January 1984)
 Founding Grand Master of the Order of Taming Sari (1977 – 31 January 1984)
 Grand Master of the Order of the Perak State Crown (5 January 1963 – 31 January 1984)

  : 
 Recipient of the Order of the Crown of the Realm (DMN) (1963)
 :
 Recipient of the Malaysian Commemorative Medal (Gold) (PPM) (1965)
 :
 Grand Commander of the  Royal Family Order of Johor (DK I) (1967)

References

Idris Iskandar al-Mutawakkil Alallahi Shah
People from Kuala Kangsar
1924 births
1984 deaths
Malaysian Muslims
Malaysian people of Malay descent

Companions of the Order of St Michael and St George
Idris Iskandar al-Mutawakkil Alallahi Shah
Recipients of the Order of the Crown of the Realm
First Classes of the Royal Family Order of Johor